The 1952 SANFL Grand Final was an Australian rules football championship match.   beat  153 to 43.

Teams

References 

SANFL Grand Finals
SANFL Grand Final, 1952